Maduka Liyanapathiranage (born 4 January 1992) is a Sri Lankan cricketer. He made his first-class debut for Colombo Cricket Club in the 2011–12 Premier Trophy on 17 February 2012. In January 2016, playing for Chilaw Marians Cricket Club, he took nine wickets in an innings against Tamil Union Cricket and Athletic Club in the 2015–16 Premier League Tournament.

See also
 List of Chilaw Marians Cricket Club players

References

External links
 

1992 births
Living people
Sri Lankan cricketers
Chilaw Marians Cricket Club cricketers
Colombo Cricket Club cricketers
Cricketers from Colombo